Euphaedra campaspe is a butterfly in the family Nymphalidae. It is found in Gabon, the Republic of the Congo, the Central African Republic and the Democratic Republic of the Congo.

Subspecies
Euphaedra campaspe campaspe (Gabon, Congo, Central African Republic)
Euphaedra campaspe permixtoides Hecq, 1986 (Democratic Republic of the Congo)

Similar species
Other members of themis species group q.v.

References

Butterflies described in 1867
campaspe
Butterflies of Africa
Taxa named by Baron Cajetan von Felder
Taxa named by Rudolf Felder